Ran Bosilek (26 September 1886 in Gabrovo – 8 October 1958 in Sofia), born Gencho Stanchev Negentsov, was a Bulgarian author of children's books. Three years before his death, in 1955, he translated Astrid Lindgren's children's book "Karlsson-on-the-Roof" into Bulgarian.

References
Biography and Excerpts (in Bulgarian)

1886 births
1958 deaths
People from Gabrovo
Bulgarian writers
Bulgarian children's writers
Bulgarian male writers
Bulgarian translators
20th-century translators